Evretou is a village in the Paphos District of Cyprus, located 6 km southwest of Lysos.

The population in 1962 was 125 Turkish Cypriots. There were 22 displaced Turkish Cypriots from the loukournou village still living in Evretou in 1971 according to Richard Patrick.
A village that it was dangerous to be visited by anyone other than Turkish Cypriot due to the intercommunal fighting in 1963-64
The meaning of the name is a place where something of value is discovered. The name was changed in 1958 to dereboyu meaning along the river.
Fifty of the residents were afraid to stay in the village and after 1974 they went secretly through the mountains of Troodos in the occupied areas in the North. The remaining 112 residents were transferred in 3-9-1975  in the occupied areas in the north with a convoy set up by Unficyp. 
The municipal building has been renovated but its in poor condition now. The school and the mosque renovated with European union funds has been also renovated and is in better shape. The corn mill is under the waters of the evretou dam and all the buildings if the village are falling apart and in few years will disappear unless they are renovated.

References

Communities in Paphos District